Shigeyuki (written: ,  or ) is a masculine Japanese given name. Notable people with the name include:

, Japanese speed skater
, Japanese boxer
, Japanese baseball player
, Japanese politician
Shigeyuki Hori, Japanese automotive engineer
Shigeyuki Kihara, New Zealand artist
, Japanese sprinter
, Japanese poet
, Japanese politician

Japanese masculine given names